Parmanu is an Indian superhero published by Raj Comics His super powers include splitting into atoms and flying to travel from one place to other and to reduce or increase his own size. The character is inspired from Atom. Parmanu got killed in akhiri series by blasting himself in space to save earth.

Fictional Character Background
Vinay saw a group of criminals kill his classmate when he was in high school. He vowed to avenge her death. He found the murder weapon, a revolver, and discovered that the killer was the head of police himself. To protect himself from the law, the head of police attempted to recover the revolver and tried to kill Vinay to accomplish this. Vinay was rescued by his maternal Uncle, Prof. K.K. Verma, and was brought to his lab. The monster Bufalo attacked them there and Prof. K.K. Verma revealed to Vinay that he had made a costume that could give him superpowers. Vinay put on the costume and became the Wonderman Parmanu. After a long struggle, Vinay succeeded in killing Bufalo. Thereafter, he avenged his classmate by killing the head of police.

Vinay's parents, along with most of his family, were killed during the hunt for the criminal. His brother, Vijay, and his uncle, Prof K.K. Verma, were the only surviving members of his family. The first comic of the series shows that Vijay helped the gangsters, and in this situation he had to kill his own brother.

Allies
Mamta Pathak (Pralayanka)
Professor Kamal Kumar Verma
Shipra
Sheena
Probot
Inspector Dhanush
Hawaldaar Baan

Enemies
Itihaas
Diamond Killer
General Kharonch
Dr. No
Dr. Madagascar 
Baluchi
Madam Cold
Ratan Daga
Gunaakar
Holika
Vriksha
Fandebaaz
Hyena
Typhoon
BuddhiPalat
Ghonga
Angaar
Cactus
Neem Hakim
ZeroG
Nashketu
Programmer
Aakaa
Principal

Powers and Abilities
Parmanu's costume gives him various superpowers. He can fly up to speed of sound with ease and can go beyond it. He can fire atomic bolts from his chest. His wrist gadgets can fire atomic bolts as well and reel out atomic rope. His belt contains many gadgets which help him to teleport, atomize, and reduce his size to any desired level. Initially, he used the button on his belt to do these actions, but later on Probot changed it into a voice recognition device, so that he could use his powers just by calling its name.

Parmanu receives back up from Probot, a robot who keeps an eye on Delhi with the help of his cameras, which he has fitted in numerous locations around the city. And he also gets help from Pralayanka (Mamta Pathak) who also is a creation of his maternal uncle like him.

Titles
 Parmanu
 Aag
 Bulletproof
 Makhhi
 Jonk
 Khor
 Bichhu
 Lutere
 Blade
 Gangster
 Barood
 Alpin
 Baaj
 Lattoo
 Drinda
 Kekda
 Rewalwer
 Black Out
 Underworld
 Daddu
 Hahakaar
 Folad
 Street Gang
 Dynamite
 Aapahij Gunde
 Ek Aur Parmanu
 Sawdhan
 Taifoon
 Madam Cold
 Vriksha
 Qahar
 Black Spider
 Angar
 Gunaker
 Ab Marega Parmanu
 Budhipalat
 Takker
 Meri dress vapas kar 

Raj Comics has produced several hundred titles on Parmanu. A list could be seen at
Titles by Raj Comics

Other Appearances

 Nanhe Samrat Magazine
Heroes in Real Harsh World Book Series
Parmanu (Trendy Baba Series, Book # 01)
Indian Comics Fandom Magazine
Vigyapans (Trendy Baba Series, Book #07)
Fang Magazine (Raj Comics)
World Comics & Graphic Novels News (WCGNN)

References

External links
Blogs on Parmanu
Indiatimes Comics Article
Indian Fanfic Podcast Series
Parmanu - Comic Book Religion Profile

Raj Comics superheroes
Indian comics characters
Indian superheroes
Indian comics
Works about nuclear technology
Atomic and nuclear energy research in India